Partecosta fuscolutea is a species of sea snail, a marine gastropod mollusc in the family Terebridae, the auger snails.

Description
The length of the shell attains 7.2 mm.

Distribution
This marine species occurs off Madagascar

References

 Bozzetti L. (2008). Six new Terebridae (Gastropoda: Neogastropoda: Terebridae) from southern Madagascar. Malacologia Mostra Mondiale, 60: 9–14

External links
 Fedosov, A. E.; Malcolm, G.; Terryn, Y.; Gorson, J.; Modica, M. V.; Holford, M.; Puillandre, N. (2020). Phylogenetic classification of the family Terebridae (Neogastropoda: Conoidea). Journal of Molluscan Studies

Terebridae
Gastropods described in 2008